Vivian Ortiz (born 30 December 1948) is a Mexican swimmer. She competed in the women's 100 metre freestyle at the 1968 Summer Olympics.

References

External links
 

1948 births
Living people
Mexican female freestyle swimmers
Olympic swimmers of Mexico
Swimmers at the 1968 Summer Olympics
Swimmers from Mexico City